CIBU-FM is a Canadian radio station, which broadcasts at 94.5 FM in Wingham, Ontario. The station broadcasts a classic hits format with the brand name Cool 94.5.

In 2003, the CRTC denied the application by Blackburn Radio. In 2004, Blackburn Radio was given approval to operate a new FM radio station at Wingham. The station was launched on April 1, 2005 by Blackburn Radio with the branding 94.5 The Bull.

The station's transmitter is located near Formosa, and it broadcasts the signal with an effective radiated power of 75,000 watts. The station is co-located with sister stations CKNX and CKNX-FM.

The station also re-broadcasts at 91.7 in Bluewater under the call sign CIBU-FM-1.

The station's morning show is hosted by Phil Main.

In April 2014, the station removed new rock from its playlist, now airing mostly classic rock with the branding Classic Rock 94.5.

On September 4, 2020 the station switched to a classic hits format branded as Cool 94.5.

References

External links
 Cool 94.5
 
 

Ibu
Ibu
Ibu
Radio stations established in 2005
2005 establishments in Ontario